Chris & Cosey, sometimes known as Carter Tutti, are a musical duo formed in 1981, consisting of couple Chris Carter (electronics) and Cosey Fanni Tutti (electronics, guitar, cornet), both previously (and currently the sole surviving) members of industrial music pioneers Throbbing Gristle. Since the release of their 1981 debut album Heartbeat, the group have expanded on the rhythmic ideas of Throbbing Gristle while adding synthesized pop elements to their sound.

History 
When Throbbing Gristle broke up in 1981, members Carter and Tutti signed with Rough Trade Records and began recording as Chris & Cosey.  They recorded four albums for the label using electronics, sampling, Cosey's vocals and cornet playing.  In 1983, they formed their own independent record label Creative Technology Institute (aka CTI)  to release more experimental works and collaborations.  The first CTI projects, Elemental 7 and European Rendezvous, were released through Cabaret Voltaire's DoubleVision label.

In the late 1980s and early 1990s, the duo worked with a number of independent labels such as Nettwerk (Canada), Play It Again Sam (Belgium), Staalplaat (Netherlands), and Wax Trax! (USA), and World Serpent Distribution (UK).  In 1992, for artistic and health reasons, the duo stopped touring and concentrated on studio work. They returned to performing live in 1998, documented on the Union album.

Since the couple began collaborating, Carter and Tutti have worked with a variety of similarly respected and recognized avant-garde artists including, Monte Cazazza, Coil, Current 93, John Duncan, Erasure, Eurythmics, Boyd Rice, and Robert Wyatt. The 1988 album Core is a collection of these collaborations.

Carter and Tutti's tracks have been remixed by world-renowned DJs including Carl Craig, Cosmic Connection, Fred Giannelli, Daniel Miller, μ-Ziq, Vapourspace and Andrew Weatherall.

Carter and Tutti have released two ongoing CD series of instrumental music: The Library Of Sound (L.O.S.) and Electronic Ambient Remixes (E.A.R.), currently with four volumes each.  The E.A.R. series are remixes of material released solo by Carter or Tutti. Tracks from both these instrumental series have been used internationally in gallery installations, performed at numerous electronic music festivals, utilized on TV and radio broadcasts and within Hollywood movie trailers.

2000 to present
To greet the 21st century, Chris & Cosey became Carter Tutti, celebrating the rebirth with a series of concerts which were documented on the live album LEM Festival October 2003.  The rebirth was completed by the release of the studio album Cabal later that year.  Both also appeared as guests on the 2006 Current 93 album Black Ships Ate the Sky.

Carter and Tutti re-engaged with Throbbing Gristle, which reformed with all four original members for a December 2004 All Tomorrow's Parties festival appearance, and recorded several new studio albums over the following years – TG Now (2004) and Part Two (2007). They also performed a short series of concerts in Europe and the United States in 2009, with a rare tour-only release album, The Third Mind Movements. (Ostensibly, the few remaining copies were sold via mail-order through the Throbbing Gristle website upon completion of the tour).

In October 2010 Throbbing Gristle began a European tour; however, several days following the band's first tour date at the Hackney Dissenting Academy, London, Throbbing Gristle's website announced that Genesis P-Orridge was no longer willing to perform with the band, and would return home to New York. Chris, Cosey and Peter 'Sleazy' Christopherson finished the tour without P-Orridge, performing under the name X-TG.

Carter and Tutti performed with Nik Colk Void of Factory Floor at Mute's Short Circuit Festival in May 2011.  A live album of the show, with an additional studio track, was released as Transverse in 2012, under the name Carter Tutti Void.

Discography

Albums
Heartbeat (1981), Rough Trade
Trance (1982), Rough Trade
Songs of Love & Lust (1984), Rough Trade
Technø Primitiv (1985), Rough Trade
Allotropy (1987), Staalplaat
Sweet Surprise (1987), Dragon
Exotika (1987), Play It Again Sam
Trust (1989), Play It Again Sam
Pagan Tango (1991), Play It Again Sam/WaxTrax!
Musik Fantastique (1992), Play It Again Sam
Twist (1995), T&B Vinyl
Skimble Skamble (1997), World Serpent
Cabal (2004), CTI – Carter Tutti
Feral Vapours of the Silver Ether (2007), CTI – as Carter Tutti
Transverse (2012), Mute – as Carter Tutti Void
f(x) (2015), Industrial Records – as Carter Tutti Void
Triumvirate (2019), Industrial Records – as Carter Tutti Void

Live albums
Action! (1987), LD
Union (1999), World Serpent
C&C Luchtbal (2003) CTI, live album
LEM Festival October 2003 (2004) GliptotekaMagdalae, as Carter Tutti
Transverse (2012), Mute, as Carter Tutti Void

as CTI
Elemental 7 (1984), DoubleVision
European Rendezvous – CTI Live 1983 (1984), DoubleVision
Core (1988), Nettwerk/Play It Again Sam
Metaphysical – "The library of sound" Edition One (1993), World Serpent
Chronomanic – "The library of sound" Edition Two (1994), World Serpent
In Continuum – "The library of sound" Edition Three (1995), World Serpent
Point Seven – "The library of sound" Edition Four (1998), World Serpent

Compilations
Collectiv One: Conspiracy International (1989), Play It Again Sam
Collectiv Two: The Best of Chris and Cosey (1989), Play It Again Sam
Collectiv Three: An Elemental Rendevous [sic] (1990), Play It Again Sam
Collectiv Four: Archive Recordings (1990), Play It Again Sam
Reflection (1990), WaxTrax!
The Essential Chris & Cosey Collection (2002), World Serpent
Collected Works 1981 – 2000 (2006), Conspiracy International

EPs
Take Five (1986), Licensed
C + C Musik (1995), T&B Vinyl – promotional only

Singles
"Night Shift" (1982) – flexi-disc with Vinyl magazine, split with Minimal Compact
"This is Me" (1983), Music Time – split with Wahnfried-Brown
"October (Love Song)" (1983), Rough Trade
"Sweet Surprise" (1985), Rough Trade
"Obsession" (1987), Play It Again Sam
"Obsession (remix)" (1987), Nettwerk
"Exotika" (1988), Play It Again Sam
"Exotika (extended remix)" (1988), Nettwerk
"Rise" (1988), Play It Again Sam
"Synaesthesia" (1991), Play It Again Sam
"Passion" (1991), World Serpent

as Conspiracy International
"Hammer House" (1984), CTI
"Thy Gift of Tongues" (1985), CTI

Videos
Live Vol. 1 (1996), Conspiracy International (VHS)

References

Bibliography

External links
 
 
 Trouser Press: Chris and Cosey

English electronic music duos
British industrial music groups
British dark wave musical groups
Ableton Live users
Musical groups established in 1981
Wax Trax! Records artists